Spheroolithus is an oogenus of dinosaur egg.

Oospecies 
The following species are described:
 Paraspheroolithus sanwangbacunensis
 Paraspheroolithus yangchengensis
 Spheroolithus albertensis
 Spheroolithus choteauensis 
 Spheroolithus europaeus
 Spheroolithus irenensis
 Spheroolithus jincunensis
 Spheroolithus maiasauroides
 Spheroolithus megadermus
 Spheroolithus spheroides
 Spheroolithus tenuicorticus

Distribution 
Fossils of the oogenus were found in:
 Dinosaur Park and Oldman Formations, Alberta, Canada
 China
 Sasayama Group, Japan
 Cerro del Pueblo Formation (Difunta Group), Mexico
 Nemegt & Bayan Shireh Formations, Mongolia
 La Posa Formation (Tremp Group), Spain
 Two Medicine Formation, Montana and North Horn Formation, Utah, United States

Gallery

See also 
 List of dinosaur oogenera

References

Bibliography 
 Carpenter, K. 1999. Eggs, Nests, and Baby Dinosaurs: A Look at Dinosaur Reproduction (Life of the Past). Indiana University Press, Bloomington, Indiana
 Z. Zhao. 1979. [Advances in the study of fossil dinosaur eggs in our country]. Mesozoic and Cenozoic red beds of South China; selected papers from the field conference on the South China Cretaceous-Early Tertiary red beds. Science Press, Beijing 330-340

Dinosaur reproduction
Late Cretaceous dinosaurs
Milk River Formation
Paleontology in Alberta
Paleontology in Montana
Cretaceous geology of Utah
Paleontology in Utah
Cretaceous China
Fossils of China
Cretaceous Japan
Fossils of Japan
Cretaceous Mongolia
Fossils of Mongolia
Cretaceous Spain
Fossils of Spain
Tremp Formation
Fossil parataxa described in 1979